Kazimieras Vasiliauskas can refer to:
Kazim Vasiliauskas - Lithuanian racing driver.
Kazimieras Vasiliauskas (1922) - priest